The 2004 Fallujah Blackwater incident occurred on March 31, 2004, when Iraqi insurgents attacked a convoy containing four American contractors from the private military company Blackwater USA who were conducting a delivery for food caterers ESS.

The ambush
The four armed contractors, Scott Helvenston, Jerry Zovko, Wesley Batalona, and Mike Teague, were killed and dragged from their vehicles. Their bodies were beaten and burned, with their charred corpses then dragged through the city streets before being hanged over a bridge crossing the Euphrates River.

Reactions
Photos of the event, showing jubilant Iraqis posing with the charred corpses, were then released to news agencies worldwide, which caused a great deal of indignation in the United States. This prompted the announcement of a counter-insurgency campaign in the city.

Response
The ambush led to the First Battle of Fallujah, a U.S.-led operation to retake control of the city. However, the battle was halted mid-way for political reasons, an outcome which commentators have described as insurgent victory. Seven months later, in November 2004, a second attempt at capturing the city, the Second Battle of Fallujah, proved successful.

Intelligence reports concluded that Ahmad Hashim Abd al-Isawi was the mastermind behind the attack, and was not captured until a successful Navy SEAL operation in 2009.  al-Isawi was held for a time by the United States intelligence community and testified at one of the 2010 courts-martial of SEALs he accused of mistreating him while detained at Camp Schwedler.  He was subsequently handed over to Iraqi authorities for trial and executed by hanging some time before November 2013.

2005 lawsuit

The families of the victims filed suit (Helvenston et al. v. Blackwater Security) against Blackwater USA for wrongful death in January 2005.

References

2004 murders in Iraq
21st-century mass murder in Iraq
2004 in Iraq
Blackwater (company)
Occupation of Iraq
Fallujah
Terrorist incidents in Iraq in 2004
Ambushes
March 2004 events in Iraq